The Tongan women's national sevens team represents Tonga in rugby sevens.

The team has played at the 2010 and 2011 Asia-Pacific Championship, the Oceania Women's Sevens Championship since 2012, and the 2015 2015 Pacific Games.

They won the Bowl final at the 2011 Borneo Women’s Sevens competition which included teams from Asia and the Oceanic region.

Squad
Squad to 2015 Pacific Games:
Nina Alofaki
Isapela Kamoto
Sela Vaenuku
Eseta Vi
Ema Potaufa
Losalini Potaufa
Kiana Muamoholeva
Sharon Vailea
Pesalini Lave
Seini Haukinima
Lesila Lautaimi
Fakaola Malungahu

Previous Squads

Results

Asia-Pacific Championship 2010
29–31 October 2010 at Kota Kinabalu, Borneo
Pool Stage
  24 - 0 
  25 - 0 

Quarter finals
  12 - 5 

Plate Semi-finals
  bye

Plate final (5th place)
  14 - 7

2011 Borneo Women’s Sevens
23–25 October 2011 at Kota Kinabalu, Borneo

Pool Stage

  21 - 15 
  0 - 25 
  17 - 10 

Quarter finals
  15 - 0 

Plate Semi-finals
  7 - 12 

Bowl final
  0 - 42

References

External links
 Tonga Rugby Union Official Site

S
Women's national rugby sevens teams